Étienne Allegrain (1644 – 2 April 1736) was a French topographical painter. Inspired by Nicolas Poussin, he evoked still ambiences and atmospherics bathed in a deep play of light and shade.

His grand-son Christophe-Gabriel Allegrain became a famous sculptor.

External links
 Étienne Allegrain in Artcyclopedia

References
 Anne Lossel-Guillien, À la recherche de l'œuvre d'Etienne Allegrain, paysagiste de la fin du règne de Louis XIV, Histoire de l'art, n° 4 1998.

1644 births
1736 deaths
17th-century French painters
French male painters
18th-century French painters
18th-century French male artists